The Myanmar national beach soccer team represents Myanmar in international beach soccer competitions and is controlled by the Myanmar Football Federation, the governing body for football in Myanmar.

FIFA Beach Soccer World Cup
The team has failed to qualify for each of the FIFA Beach Soccer World Cups held since the 1995 Beach Soccer World Championship in Brazil up to and including the 2015 FIFA Beach Soccer World Cup in Portugal. The qualifying rounds for the 2017 FIFA Beach Soccer World Cup are scheduled to take place in 2016 and 2017.

Current squad

Achievements

AFF Beach Soccer Championship

References

External links
Aseanfootball.org
Aseanfootball.org
The-afc.com

Asian national beach soccer teams
B